The 1982–83 NBA season was the Kings 34th season in the NBA and their 11th season in the city of Kansas City.

Draft picks

Roster

Regular season

Season standings

z - clinched division title
y - clinched division title
x - clinched playoff spot

Record vs. opponents

Game log

Player statistics

Awards and records

Transactions

See also
 1982-83 NBA season

References

Sacramento Kings seasons
K
Kansas City
Kansas City